Presnell is a surname and given name. People with that name include:

 Alistair Presnell (born 1979), Australian professional golfer
 Glenn Presnell (1905-2004), American football player, coach, and college athletics administrator
 Gregory A. Presnell (born 1942), Senior United States District Judge of the United States District Court for the Middle District of Florida
 Harve Presnell (1933-2009), American actor and singer
 Michele D. Presnell (born 1952), Republican member of the North Carolina General Assembly
 Pres Mull (Presnell Alfonzo Mull, 1922-2005), American football player and coach

See also